Luís Caliço (born 31 August 1969) is a Portuguese windsurfer. He competed in the men's Division II event at the 1988 Summer Olympics.

References

1969 births
Living people
Portuguese male sailors (sport)
Portuguese windsurfers
Olympic sailors of Portugal
Sailors at the 1988 Summer Olympics – Division II
Place of birth missing (living people)